The 1982–83 Primera División B de Baloncesto was the second tier of the 1982–83 Spanish basketball season.

Regular season

(1) Calasancio 1 pt deducted.

References

External links
Hemeroteca El Mundo Deportivo
Hemeroteca La Vanguardia

Primera División B de Baloncesto
Primera
Second level Spanish basketball league seasons